The Faculty of Science is the largest of six faculties at McMaster University in Hamilton, Ontario, Canada. Founded in 1962, the faculty is located in the Westdale neighbourhood. It houses 6,800 undergraduate students and 600 graduate students, across  39 upper-year undergraduate programs ranging from astrophysics, biochemistry, earth and environmental sciences, to life sciences, human behaviour, kinesiology and medical and radiation sciences. Notable discoveries at McMaster University include the development of neutron spectroscopy by Bertram Brockhouse which earned him a Nobel Prize in Physics in 1994.

Under the presidency of Dr. H.G. Thode in the 1960s, scientific research at McMaster was intensive and yielded important discoveries in the areas of science and engineering. In 1959, McMaster's Nuclear Reactor was built for the purpose of nuclear and medical radiation research. McMaster is the only Canadian university that contains a nuclear reactor in their campus. Scientific research at McMaster University earned the university high rankings in the areas of research and strength in science, where it is ranked seventh in Canada and 212th in the world according to QS University Rankings 2017 for Natural Sciences.

Departments, Schools and Programs of the Faculty of Science
There are 7 departments and 2 interdisciplinary schools in the Faculty of Science:

Department of Biochemistry and Biomedical Sciences
Department of Biology
Department of Chemistry & Chemical Biology
School of Earth, Environment & Society
School of Interdisciplinary Science
Department of Kinesiology
Department of Mathematics & Statistics
Department of Physics & Astronomy
Department of Psychology, Neuroscience & Behaviour

Academic programs

A co-op (or cooperative education) option is offered in 14 undergraduate science programs: 
Actuarial & Financial Mathematics, Biochemistry, Biology & Pharmacology, BioPhysics, Chemical Biology, Chemistry, Earth & Environmental Sciences, Environmental Sciences, Life Sciences, Mathematics & Statistics, Medical & Health Physics, Molecular Biology & Genetics and Physics. The term "cooperative education" emphasizes the partnership between the employer, the student and university. Students taking the science co-op option have 4 work terms employed in their field in addition to the regular academic requirements. The co-op program is typically completed in 5 years.

The Faculty of Science offers Masters and PhD degrees in 16 graduate programs .

Deans of Science

Scientific Research

There are currently 6 Funded and Endowed Research Chairs, 19 Canada Research Chairs, and 3 Faculty of Science Research Chairs in the Faculty of Science.

Funded and Endowed Research Chairs

Canada Research Chairs

Faculty of Science Research Chairs

Centres, Institutes and Facilities
The Faculty of Science hosts or supports several research-based centres and institutes that feature integrated, multi-disciplinary work. 
Biointerfaces Institute uses high-throughput methods to better understand the interface between biological and synthetic materials. By studying how biological systems respond to synthetic materials, and vice versa, the Institute seeks to expand our ability to create better biosensors and medical implants, among other applications.
Brockhouse Institute for Material Research is named after Nobel Prize winner Bertram Brockhouse and is dedicated to materials research, development and analysis. Facilities include the Canadian Centre for Electron Microscopy (CCEM), Centre for Crystal Growth, McMaster Analytical X-ray Diffraction Facility, and the Photonics Research Laboratories.
McMaster Centre for Climate Change is a multidisciplinary research centre with the established goal of bringing together researchers to study and model climate processes, the effects of climate change, and their possible mitigation.
McMaster Institute for Music and Mind, where scientists, researchers, and musicians study questions about the physical structure, evolution, neural processing, performance, and perception of music, dance and media arts.
McMaster Institute for Transportation and Logistics (MITL) was created to work with business and government partners to improve the efficiency of transportation systems and the competitiveness of the logistics/manufacturing sector.
Nuclear Research Building, McMaster Nuclear Reactor
Thode Library of Science and Engineering
Origins Institute conducts transdisciplinary research to study fundamental questions in science. Areas of exploration include the origin of life and astrobiology, astrophysics, the origins of dark matter and dark energy in the universe, and the beginnings of life.
Physical Activity Centre of Excellence (PACE) is an exercise research and training centre. Researchers study ways to improve health and well-being among older adults and people with chronic disease or disability.

References

External links 

 University of McMaster Science Society  
Tour of the Faculty of Science

McMaster University